Gavin James Wood (born 1980) is an English computer scientist, a founder of Ethereum and creator of Polkadot and Kusama.

Early life
Wood was born in Lancaster, England, United Kingdom. He attended the Lancaster Royal Grammar School. He graduated from the University of York with a Master of Engineering (MEng) in Computer Systems and Software Engineering in 2002 and completed his PhD entitled "Content-based visualisation to aid common navigation of musical audio" in 2005.

Career
Before working on Ethereum, Wood was a research scientist at Microsoft. He was one of the founders of the Ethereum blockchain, which he has described as "one computer for the entire planet," with Vitalik Buterin, Charles Hoskinson, Anthony Di Iorio and Joseph Lubin during 2013–2014. Wood proposed and helped develop Solidity, a programming language for writing smart contracts. He also released the paper defining the Ethereum Virtual Machine, the runtime system for smart contracts in Ethereum, in 2014. He also served as the Ethereum Foundation's first chief technology officer. Wood left the Ethereum Foundation in January of 2016.

Wood founded Parity Technologies (formerly Ethcore), which developed a client for the Ethereum network and creates software for companies using blockchain technology, with Jutta Steiner, who also previously worked at the Ethereum Foundation. The company released the Parity Ethereum software client, written in Rust, in early 2016. He held the title of chief web officer at Parity in 2018.

He founded the Web3 Foundation, a nonprofit organization focusing on decentralised internet infrastructure and technology, starting with the Polkadot network. In comparison to Bitcoin's proof of work mechanism, Polkadot relies on proof of stake mechanism and allows developers to create their own blockchain that can talk to other ledgers, forming a system of parachains. Developers can decide what kind of transaction fees to charge and how fast to confirm blocks of transactions across the digital ledgers. In 2019, he founded Kusama, an early stage experimental development environment for Polkadot.

Charity 
Amid 2022 Russian invasion of Ukraine Wood donated $5.8 million in cryptocurrency to support Ukraine.

Publications
Ethereum: A Secure Decentralised Generalised Transaction Ledger
Polkadot: Vision for a Heterogenous Multi-Chain Framework

References

1980 births
Living people
British technology company founders
People educated at Lancaster Royal Grammar School
Alumni of the University of York
People associated with Ethereum
People from Lancaster, Lancashire
Chief technology officers